Salah is the Islamic prayer.

Salah may also refer to:
Salah (name), a Biblical and an Arabic given name and family name
Salah (biblical figure), an ancestor of the Israelites 
Salah (dancer) (born 1979), a French hip-hop dancer
Salah, Iran, a village 
Mohamed Salah, Egyptian football player

See also

Saleh (name)
Saladin (disambiguation)
Salat (disambiguation)